Jacko McDonagh (born 26 April 1962) is an Irish former professional footballer who played for Bohemians and Shamrock Rovers during his career in Ireland.

Career
McDonagh signed for Rovers in the summer of 1982 departing for France to sign for Marcel Domingo at Nîmes Olympique in July 1985.

He also played for K.S.V. Waregem in Belgium making three appearances in the 1988–89 UEFA Cup.

In April 1983 he played for the League of Ireland XI U21s against their Italian League counterparts who included Roberto Mancini and Gianluca Vialli in their team.

He made his international debut for Republic of Ireland in an 8–0 win over Malta in November 1983 at Dalymount Park. In all he won three senior  and four U21 caps as well as Inter-League caps and youth caps. He represented Rovers six times in European competition.

In September 2011 McDonagh broke his leg playing for Ireland Veterans against England Veterans at Whitehall Stadium.

Honours
Shamrock Rovers
 League of Ireland: 1983–84, 1984–85
 FAI Cup: 1985
 Dublin City Cup: 1983–84

Individual
 PFAI Young Player of the Year: 1981–82

References

External links
 

Living people
1962 births
Republic of Ireland association footballers
Association football defenders
Republic of Ireland international footballers
Republic of Ireland under-21 international footballers
Republic of Ireland youth international footballers
Bohemian F.C. players
Shamrock Rovers F.C. players
Nîmes Olympique players
Derry City F.C. players
Oxford United F.C. players
K.S.V. Waregem players
League of Ireland players
Ligue 2 players
Belgian Pro League players
League of Ireland XI players
Expatriate footballers in France
Irish expatriate sportspeople in France
Expatriate footballers in Belgium
Irish expatriate sportspeople in Belgium